A medium-range ballistic missile (MRBM) is a type of ballistic missile with medium range, this last classification depending on the standards of certain organizations.

Specific MRBMs

 DF-2 - 
 DF-16 - 
 DF-17 - 
 DF-21 -  (China) , (Saudi Arabia) 

 SSBS S1

 Agni II - 
 Agni-P - 

 Ashoura - 
 Emad - 
 Fajr-3 - (estimation)
 Ghadr-110 - 
 Khorramshahr (missile) -  
 Sejjil - 
 Shahab-3 - 

 Badr-2000 - 

 Jericho II - 

 Hwasong-9 - 
 Hwasong-10/RD-B Musudan - 
 Pukkuksong-1 -  
 Pukkuksong-2 - 
 Pukkuksong-2 - 
 Rodong-1 - 

 Ababeel - 
 Ghauri-I - 
 Ghauri-II - 
 Ghauri-III -  (Cancelled)
 Shaheen-II - 
 Shaheen-III - 

 J-600T Yıldırım IV -  - under development

 R-5 Pobeda - 
 R-12 Dvina - 
 RT-15 -  

 Long-Range Hypersonic Weapon - over 
 OpFires - around 
 Pershing II - 
 PGM-19 Jupiter -

See also
Intercontinental ballistic missile (ICBM)
Intermediate-range ballistic missile (IRBM)
Short-range ballistic missile (SRBM)
Theatre ballistic missiles
Hypersonic cruise missile

References

Ballistic missiles